St. John’s College is an Anglican college affiliated to the University of Hong Kong, which provides accommodation to undergraduates and postgraduates. As the successor of St. John’s Hall, which was founded in 1912, the College is the oldest residential hall/college of the University. Constitutionally, the College is a body corporate established by statute, the St. John’s College Ordinance (Chapter 1089, Laws of Hong Kong), on 27 April 1956. As such, unlike other residential halls/colleges that are directly administered by the University, the College enjoys financial and administrative independence. The Ricci Hall, run by the Jesuits, is the only other non-University-administered hall.

The aims of the College, as specified in the Preamble of the St. John’s College Ordinance, are "the pursuit of virtue and sound learning with faith in God and within the order of the Anglican Communion; and to this end to provide accommodation for teachers and students of all races where they may live, study and worship together; and to promote extramural activities in Christian learning and service, that the members of the College may the better understand and fulfil their duty to God and their neighbours".

The incumbent President of St. John's College Council is The Most Rev. Andrew Chan Au-ming, Archbishop and Primate of the Hong Kong Sheng Kung Hui. The Master of College is Dr. Wong Kwok Chun, Associate Professor in the Department of Real Estate of HKU.

History

Origin of residential education 
In January 1908, Governor Lugard alluded to the scheme of establishing HKU at the prize-giving of St. Stephen’s College, a boarding school run by the Church Missionary Society (CMS) for the sons of Chinese gentry. Shortly afterwards, Sir Mody offered to contribute to the university’s building costs, and work had been swiftly undertaken to consider and prepare for the scheme. Already then a committee convened by the Governor had decided that the objects of HKU must include the development and formation of "the character of students no less than their intellectual faculties". In a memorandum dated 20 March 1910, Governor Lugard elaborated on this point:

It has been said that the Hongkong University aims at giving a purely secular education…, and that it will provide for the material and intellectual development only, while neglecting the training of character and morals. Were this the case I at any rate would not have given my cordial support to the project… in order to ensure discipline and moral education it has been decided that no external students shall be accepted unless they live in Hostels conducted under strict regulations framed by the Council. Such Hostels will consist exclusively of establishments founded and conducted by Religious bodies who desire to maintain supervision, during their career at the University, over the pupils whom they have educated in their schools. All others will be required to reside within the precincts under the close supervision of the Staff, and we hope, by engaging men of the right stamp and not mere educationalists, to thus bring the best influences to bear on the Undergraduates.

Founding of St. John’s Hall 

Against this background, the CMS made plans to build an Anglican hostel. Their appeal for funds was supported by Governor Lugard, who looked to the CMS for continuing "its care and discipline of its own students".

The question of providing a CMS hostel was officially raised at the Church Conference of the Diocese in September 1910 by Bishop Lander, who considered the scheme "a challenge to our Church that we must not decline". At that time, the CMS possessed a site directly opposite to the proposed university, which housed the CMS Girls’ School, known as "Fairlea" (established 1886). It was decided that the CMS hostel would be erected there and the Girls’ School would be moved elsewhere. Fairlea was eventually moved to Prospect Terence, and later to Lyttelton Road, where it shared a campus with St. Stephen's Girls' College until 1936, when Fairlea amalgamated with Victoria School to form Heep Yunn School.

The work of adapting the site and securing funds was conducted under the direction of Archdeacon E. J. Barnett, who was the Warden (the equivalent of "Principal") of St. Stephen’s College from 1903 to 1913. The Diocese of Liverpool "did much to make accomplishment possible". The old Fairlea building was adapted for residence, while a new building was erected to its East by Messrs. Denison, Ram and Gibbs. Rev. W. H. Hewitt, Chaplain of St. Stephen’s College, was the Warden-elect. He and Archdeacon Barnett together drew up the Constitution and Regulations of St. John’s Hall and the University Hostels.

When the University formally opened in September 1912, St. John’s Hall was the only hostel ready for occupation. Those to follow were: Lugard Hall (1913), Morrison Hall (1913), Eliot Hall (1914) and May Hall (1915). In the first term, 33 students were admitted to St. John’s Hall, 23 of whom were old boys of St. Stephen’s College. Those admitted to the "University Hall" (a temporary name for the secular hostels – Lugard, Eliot and May) were temporarily accommodated in the University Main Building.

Wardens and Masters

Wardens of St. John's Hall (1912-1955)

Subwardens of St. John's Hall (1912-1955)

Wardens of St. Stephen's Hall (1922-1955)

Masters of St. John's College (1955-present)

College Mission 
The mission of St. John's College is three-fold:
 To foster St. Johnians to have all-round and distinguished character.
 To make St. Johnians zealous for the College and society.
 To encourage St. Johnians to become a lifelong member of the College fraternity and community.

Collegiate System 
St. John’s College is the only residential college for undergraduate students out of the two colleges in the University of Hong Kong. Tutors offer pastoral as well as academic counselling for students.

High Table Dinner 
Adopting the tradition of Oxbridge colleges, the College hosts weekly High Table Dinners, where all members of the College congregate in formal dress and academic gowns. Prominent alumni are often invited to share their experience with students after dinner during High Table Talks.

Sherry Group 
Students have the opportunity to interact with tutors and visiting scholars in an informal setting before High Table Dinner every week.

Buildings

Marden Wing 
The Marden Wing provides single-bedroom accommodation for undergraduates. Facilities include the Common Room and College Bar.

Aw Boon Haw Wing 
The Aw Boon Haw Wing provides single-bedroom accommodation for undergraduates, tutors and fellows of the College.

Liang Chi Hao Centre 
Liang Chi Hao Centre contains the Lee Foundation Library, Senior Common Room, Bradbury Hall and Chapel. All meals, including weekly High Table Dinners, take place in the  Dining Hall (Bradbury Hall), which is situated on the third floor. Regular services are held in the College Chapel.

Wong Chik Ting Hall 
Wong Chik Ting Hall, also known as the Third Wing, or the Postgraduate Wing, provides 111 en-suite accommodation for postgraduate and visiting scholars.

College life 
The college aims to promote all-round development and holistic growth  through encouraging active participation in various sports and cultural activities.

Sports 
The college has a rich sporting history, with particular emphasis on education through "new ball games".

New ball games are team sports that offer a unique learning experience distinct from mainstream sports. As players generally have no prior experience of such sports, they start on a level playing field and gradually develop skills and camaraderie. Teams include:
Hockey (Men and Ladies)
Softball (Men and Ladies)
Lacrosse (Men)
Handball (Ladies)

Other sports teams include athletics, aquatics, badminton, basketball, soccer, squash, table tennis, tennis and volleyball.

The College has consistently attained outstanding performance in various inter-hall competitions:
Men’s Inter-Hall Sports Competition Championship
The College won the Malayan Cup in 1960, 1961, 1962, 1970, 1977, 1985, 1992, 1996, 1999, 2000, 2001, 2002, 2003, 2009, 2010, 2011, 2012 and 2013.
Ladies’ Inter-Hall Sports Competition Championship
The College won the Omega Rose Bowl in 1967, 1968, 1970, 1971, 1973, 1977, 1978, 1979, 1980, 1981, 1982, 1983, 1984, 1986, 1987, 1988, 1989, 1990, 1991, 1992, 1993 and 1994.
The Bowl was later renamed the Olma Challenge Rose Bowl and was won by the College in 1995, 1996, 1998, 1999, 2000, 2001, 2002, 2003, 2004, 2008, 2012 and 2014.

Cultural Activities 
Cultural teams include band, bridge, choir, dance, debate and drama. The Prof. Y. C. Cheng Cup was established in 1997 as an award for the Champion of Inter-Hall Cultural Competitions. The College won the Cup in 1999, 2005, 2009, 2010, 2013 and 2014.

Round the Island (RTI) 
Currently in its 30th year, RTI is an annual event where participants run a total of 38 km around Hong Kong Island. Since 2004, RTI has been used as a fundraising event for various charitable organizations.

Floor Culture 
The College occupies ten floors, each represented by a floor association. Throughout the years, each floor has developed their own unique culture and fostered strong bonds of brotherhood and sisterhood.

1/F -  Home of the Adventurers
2/F -  梁山泊
3/F -  The Magnificent Musketeers
4/F -  House of Lords
5/F -  Fifth Floor Fraternity
6/F - Sixth Floor Association
7/F - Elysium
8/F - Florence Heights
9/F - Kew Gardens
10/F - Liberata

Admissions 
The College is a non-university administered hall and thus does not participate in the Joint Hall Admission Scheme. Applicants apply directly to the College and may be invited to attend an interview for the College to assess the merits of the application. The College considers applicants’ potential to make the most out of their university hall experience and commuting distance is not a factor in the admission process.

Notable alumni
St. John’s College Alumni Association, The University of Hong Kong, Ltd. was founded in 1991 as a means of fostering contact between alumni across different generations. Over the years, the association has established itself as one of the most respected alumni bodies within the University community. The Alumni Association has been actively involved in student development and mentorship programmes, facilitating exchange between past and current St. Johnians.

Academics and educationalists 
Prof. Johannes Chan (陳文敏), Professor of Law at the University of Hong Kong and Dean of the Law Faculty (2002-2014)
Prof. Albert Chen (陳弘毅), Professor of Law at the University of Hong Kong and Dean of the Law Faculty (1996-2002)
Dr. Rayson Huang (黃麗松), Vice-Chancellor of the University of Hong Kong (1972–1986)
Prof. Poon Chung Kwong (潘宗光), President of the Hong Kong Polytechnic University (1991–2008)
Dr. Siu Yum Tong (蕭蔭堂), Professor of Mathematics at Harvard University
Dr. James Yen (晏陽初), founder of the Chinese mass education movement and the International Institute of Rural Reconstruction

Armed forces 
Major-General Lim Bo Seng (林謀盛), Commander of Force 136 (1942-1944)

Arts 
Lin Xi (林夕), lyricist
Tin Hong (天航), novelist

Diplomats 
Dr. Fu Bingchang (傅秉常), Chinese Ambassador to the USSR (1943-1949)

Government and politics 
Sir Chau Sik-nin (周錫年), Unofficial Member of the Legislative Council (1946-1959) and Executive Council (1948-1962)
Dr. York Chow (周一嶽), Secretary for Food and Health (2007-2012) and Chairman of the Equal Opportunities Commission (2013-2016)
Kwok Chan (郭贊), Unofficial Member of the Legislative Council (1953-1962)
Sir Fung Ping Fan (馮秉芬), Unofficial Member of the Legislative Council (1959-1965) and Executive Council (1962-1972)
Alan Lai (黎年), Commissioner of the Independent Commission Against Corruption (1999-2002) and Ombudsman (2009-2014)
Lee Cheuk-yan (李卓人), Legislative Council member (1998-2016)
Antony Leung (梁錦松), Financial Secretary (2001-2003)
Andrew Liao (廖長城), Executive Councillor (2002-2017)
Dr. Sarah Liao (廖秀冬), Secretary for the Environment, Transport and Works (2002-2007)
Frederick Ma (馬時亨), Secretary for Financial Services and the Treasury (2002-2007), Chairman of the MTR Corporation (2015- )
Fanny Law (羅范椒芬), Permanent Secretary for Education and Manpower (2002-2006)
Elizabeth Wong (黃錢其濂), civil servant 
Dr. Yeung Sum (楊森), Legislative Council member (1998-2008)
Rimsky Yuen (袁國強), Secretary for Justice (2012-2018)

Lawyers and judges 
Lo Hin Shing (羅顯勝), magistrate (1948-1959, 1964-1970)
Sir Yang Ti-liang (楊鐵樑), Chief Justice (1988-1996)
Wally Yeung Chun-kuen (楊振權), Vice-President of the Court of Appeal (2011-2021)

NGOs 
Dr. Dame Rosanna Wong (王䓪鳴), Executive Director of the Hong Kong Federation of Youth Groups (1980-2017)

Religion 
The Rev. Dr. Lü Chen Chung (呂振中), priest and bible translator

See also
University of Hong Kong
Education in Hong Kong

References

External links
 St. John's College's official website
 St. John's College Alumni Association

University of Hong Kong
University residences in Hong Kong
Hong Kong Sheng Kung Hui
Educational organisations based in Hong Kong
Religious education in Hong Kong